Matthew Ballin (born 5 January 1984) is an Australian former professional rugby league footballer who last played for the Wests Tigers in the National Rugby League and also the Manly Warringah Sea Eagles. Ballin is the current head coach for the Blacktown Workers Sea Eagles which is the feeder team playing in the NSW Cup Competition, prior to that he was the Under 20s Head Coach. He has played one game for Queensland in State of Origin.

Early years

Although he was born in Nanango, Queensland, Australia, Ballin grew up in Kingaroy and attended Kingaroy State High School where his father was the school principal.

Ballin played his junior football with the Kingaroy Red Ants, and although he played in the lower grades with the Brisbane Broncos, he did not play first grade for the club.

Playing career

2005-2014
Ballin signed with Sydney based club Manly-Warringah and made his NRL debut in Round 2 of the 2007 NRL season when the Sea Eagles defeated the Wests Tigers 19–8 at Leichhardt Oval, scoring a try in his first grade debut.

Ballin played in Manly's record breaking 40–0 victory over the Melbourne Storm in the 2008 NRL Grand Final where he was the game's first try scorer.

Ballin played in the 2011 NRL Grand Final giving Ballin his second NRL premiership as a player.

Coming off contract at the end of season 2012, rumours were rampant that Ballin would be a casualty of Manly's post-premiership(s) salary cap pressures, with the Canberra Raiders the front runners to secure his signature. However, after the departure of test back rower Tony Williams to the Canterbury-Bankstown Bulldogs, Manly were able to re-sign Ballin, and  Brett Stewart, to new long-term contracts keeping them at the club until the end of the 2015 and 2016 seasons  respectively, effectively ensuring both remain one-club players.

Ballin played every game for Manly in 2012 and finished the season as the league's leading tackler.

2015
In mid-2015, Ballin signed a two-year extension of his contract that would see him remain at Manly until the end of 2017. However, just a couple of months later he was one of 14 players who were reportedly told that he would not be required at the club beyond 2015. Additionally, Manly had signed South Sydney's 2014 premiership hooker Api Koroisau from Penrith as well as Brisbane Broncos hooker Matt Parcell. Ballin vowed to stay where he was and fight for his spot, even going so far as to say that he was prepared to play in Manly's New South Wales Cup team if it meant staying with the club. However, in Manly's shock 20–16 home loss to Parramatta in Round 24 of the 2015 season, Ballin suffered his second season-ending injury in consecutive years when he tore the anterior cruciate ligament (ACL) in his left knee. On 3 November, despite earlier stating he would fight for his spot at the Sea Eagles, Ballin signed a 2-year contract with the Wests Tigers starting in 2016.

2016
Returning from injury, Ballin did not make his debut for Wests Tigers until round 11. Soon after he suffered another season-ending ACL knee injury. "I played two NRL games and once in reserve grade – and I felt I contributed in those games – but obviously it wasn't enough footy. I want to be a bigger part of the team this year and play a lot more games. It's been an empty feeling sitting on the sidelines and not being able to help my teammates. When these things happen I suppose you learn to help them in different ways," he said.

2017 
Ballin made only one appearance for the Wests Tigers during the 2017 season. On 26 June 2017, Ballin announced his immediate retirement from the NRL due to chronic injuries.

Representative career
In April 2009, he was named in the preliminary 25-man squad to represent Queensland in the opening State of Origin match for 2009. However he did not make an appearance.

In 2010, with injury to Melbourne's Cameron Smith, Ballin was named in the Queensland side and played in Game 1 of the series at the ANZ Stadium in Sydney, won 28-24 by the Maroons. With Smith returning from injury, Ballin wasn't considered for the rest of the series, though he was on standby for the team should Smith's injury re-occur.

Personal life
Ballin was voted the 2008 Adidas "Sexiest Man in League".

Ballin also works as a personal fitness trainer specialising in fitness and weight loss.

Ballin is an Australian Apprenticeships Ambassador for the Australian Government.

References

External links
Wests Tigers profile
NRL profile
2015 Manly Warringah Sea Eagles profile
Hasler names two debutants as Watmough returns

1984 births
Living people
Australian rugby league players
Manly Warringah Sea Eagles players
People from Kingaroy
Queensland Rugby League State of Origin players
Rugby league hookers
Rugby league players from Queensland
Wests Tigers NSW Cup players
Wests Tigers players